Halliday Gibson Sutherland (1882–1960) was a Scottish medical doctor, writer, opponent of eugenics and the producer of Britain's first public health education cinema film in 1911.

Private life
Halliday Sutherland was born in Glasgow, Scotland on 24 June 1882, the son of John Francis Sutherland and his wife, Jane MacKay, daughter of John MacKay, a Free Church minister in Caithness. His father was physician to HM Prisons at the time of his birth, and later Depute Commissioner in Lunacy for Scotland. The family lived at 19 Roslea Drive in Glasgow. then moved to Edinburgh around 1895, living at 4 Merchiston Bank Avenue, close to the Edinburgh Asylum at Craig House.  By 1905 the family were living at 3 Moston Terrace in the Mayfield district.

Halliday was educated at High School of Glasgow and Merchiston Castle School in Edinburgh. Shortly after the First World War he became a Roman Catholic. In 1920 he married Muriel Fitzpatrick. They lived at 5 Stafford Terrace Kensington in London and had six children. He died aged 77 in the Hospital of St John and St Elizabeth, St Marylebone, London on 19 April 1960.

Career 
Sutherland graduated from Edinburgh University with a MB, Ch B in 1906 and MD with honours in 1908. Following graduation he worked closely with Robert William Philip (later "Sir"), a "pioneer of modern anti-tuberculosis schemes". In 1911, Sutherland founded a tuberculosis clinic and an open-air school in the bandstand of Regent's Park in London and produced "The Story of John M'Neil", thought to be Britain's first cinema film on health education.
During the First World War, Sutherland served in the Royal Navy (including service on RMS Empress of Britain) and in the Royal Air Force.

After the war he held the following posts:
 Physician to St Marylebone Hospital (later St Charles Hospital), Ladbroke Grove. Assistant physician to the Royal Chest Hospital.
 1920–25 Deputy Commissioner (Tuberculosis) for the South-West of Britain and joined the medical service of the London County Council.
 1941 Deputy Medical Officer of Health for Coventry
 1943–1951 Director of the mass radiography centre in Birmingham

Sutherland was President of the Tuberculosis Society of Great Britain and an honorary physician to, and council member of, the Queen Alexandra Sanatorium Fund.

In 1954 he was made a Knight Commander of the Order of Isabel the Catholic and awarded the Pope John XXI Medal in 1955.

Books 

Sutherland was a writer of books and articles. His major works were:
 The Control and Eradication of Tuberculosis: A Series of International Studies by Many Authors (Contributing Editor) (1911)
 Pulmonary Tuberculosis in General Practice (1916)
 Birth Control: A Statement of Christian Doctrine against the Neo-Malthusians (1922)
 Birth Control Exposed (1925)
 The Arches of the Years (1932)
 A Time to Keep (1934)
 Laws of Life (1935)
 In My Path (1936)
 Tuberculin Handbook (1936)
 Lapland Journey (1938)
 Hebridean Journey (1939)
 Southward Journey (1942)
 Control of Life (1944)
 Spanish Journey (1948)
 Irish Journey (1956)

The Arches of the Years was Sutherland's most successful book. It was a best-seller for 1933, ran to 35 editions in English, and was translated into eight languages. G. K. Chesterton described Sutherland's writing as follows: "Dr. Halliday Sutherland is a born writer, especially a born story-teller.  Dr. Sutherland, who is distinguished in medicine, is an amateur in the sense that he only writes when he has nothing better to do.  But when he does, it could hardly be done better."

Film 

In 1911, Sutherland produced "The Story of John M'Neil", Britain's first public health education cinema film. The 22-minute film was produced for the then new and highly popular silent films shown in cinemas. It depicts various aspects of tuberculosis including the transmission of the disease between family members, the treatments of the various stages of the disease and Sir Robert Philip's "Edinburgh System" for the prevention, treatment and cure of tuberculosis.

Public opposition of eugenics, Malthusianism and disputes with Marie Stopes 

Sutherland publicly opposed the doctrines of eugenics and Malthusianism. This brought him into a bitter and public dispute with Dr Marie Stopes.

Eugenics 
In the main, eugenists agreed with the sentiments of Dr John Haycraft who, in an 1894 speech on "Darwinism and Race Progress" at the Royal College of Physicians, had said the "preventative medicine is trying a unique experiment, and the effect is already discernible – race decay". The argument was that providing medical attention to those who would have perished in previous eras ran in the face of "the survival of the fittest". Race decay would surely result as the unfit, given succour, would live long enough to propagate their genes. Haycraft believed that the bulwark against this race decay was disease: “If we stamp out the Infectious Diseases we perpetuate Poor Types. It is a hard saying, but none the less a true one, that the bacillus tuberculosis is a friend of the race, for it attacks no healthy man or woman, but only the feeble.”

These views persisted into the new century and were reflected in the views of the Professor of Eugenics at London University, Karl Pearson, and by the President of the British Medical Association, Sir James Barr.

In "Tuberculosis, Heredity and Environment", Pearson said that the "importance of the discovery of Koch [of the tubercle bacillus] cannot be overrated," but he went on to say that this had led to a focus on infection as the cause of tuberculosis. His view was that there should have been a proper scientific inquiry as to the relative importance of the hereditary and environmental factors and of the liability to infection in the cause of the disease. Pearson had previously asserted that "the influence of environment is not one-fifth of heredity, and quite possibly not one-tenth of it," so he felt that by focussing on infection, the significant cause, heredity, was being ignored. Towards the end of his lecture, Pearson outlined the political ramifications of his findings:

Sir James Barr delivered the presidential address at the British Medical Association's 1912 conference. Recognising the progress that had been achieved in the field of medicine, he pointed out the dysgenic consequences: “We have successfully interfered with the selective death-rate which Nature employed in eliminating the unfit, but, on the other hand, we have made no serious attempt to establish a selective birth-rate so as to prevent the race being carried on by the least worthy citizens.”

Doctors had a major contribution to “raise up a vigorous, intelligent, enterprising, self-reliant and healthy race”, which “must be renewed from the mentally and physically fit...moral and physical degenerates should not be allowed to take any part in adding to the race.” He then turned his attention to tuberculosis:

The first evidence of Sutherland's opposition to eugenics appeared in a November 1912 article in the British Medical Journal: "The Seed or the Soil in Tuberculosis". In it, he rebutted the view that tuberculosis was primarily a hereditary affliction and he provided the statistics to support his assertions. He spoke out again in September 1917 when he addressed the National Council of the Y.M.C.A. in a speech: "Consumption: Its Cause and Cure". He said that while "modern medicine [has]…found the cause, sources and cure of this disease", he identified that the barriers to its prevention were man-made. The obstacles were apathy, arrogance, ignorance, indifference, and eugenics.

Stopes had met Sir Francis Galton when a child and had been interested in eugenics at least since 1912 when she joined the Eugenics Education Society (she became a life fellow in 1921). In 1921, she founded the "Society for Constructive Birth Control and Racial Progress", in part because she was "annoyed that the (Eugenics Education) Society refused to place birth control prominently on its platform". The aim of the society was to "promote eugenic birth control". At the time the issues of birth control and eugenics were closely related: one historian has written: "in the interwar years birth control and eugenics were so intertwined as to be synonymous". Stopes stated the eugenic purpose of her clinic on the second day of the Stopes v. Sutherland libel trial in 1923. Under oath, she explained the purpose of the society that had been set up to run the clinic:

Stopes outlined her eugenic vision in the final chapter of Radiant Motherhood: A Book for those Who Are Creating the Future, published in 1920. She outlined her "ardent dream" of "human stock represented only by well-formed, desired and well-endowed beautiful men and women". An obstacle to its accomplishment was "inborn incapacity" which lay "in the vast and ever increasing stock of degenerate, feeble-minded, and unbalanced who are now in our midst", a class of people who were "appallingly prolific". The solution was "a few very simple Acts of Parliament" for the compulsory sterilisation of "the miserable, the degenerate [and] the utterly wretched in mind and body".
In March 1921, Stopes opened her birth control clinic in the east-end of London.

Birth Control: A Statement of Christian Doctrine Against the Neo Malthusians 

In 1922 Sutherland wrote Birth Control: A Statement of Christian Doctrine Against the Neo Malthusians. It began:

What followed concerned politics as much as it concerned birth control. Sutherland attacked what he described as "the essential fallacies of Malthusian teaching": “Malthus did a greater and more evil thing. He forged a law of nature…that the masses should find no room at her feast; and that therefore our system of industrial capitalism was in harmony with the Will of God. Most comforting dogma!”

He said there was "no evidence whatever to prove that the population is pressing on the soil. On the contrary, we find ample physical resources sufficient to support the entire population, and we also find evidence of human injustice, incapacity, and corruption sufficient to account for the poverty and misery that exist in these countries". Sutherland argued that "organised poverty" arose when in the sixteenth century "the greater part of the land, including common land belonging to the poor, had been seized by the rich" and the Parliamentary Acts for the enclosure of common land between 1714 and 1820.

In conclusion, Sutherland foreshadowed the impact of a declining birth-rate that afflicts many developed nations today:

The Stopes v. Sutherland libel trial of 1923 

Birth Control is remembered today as the work that contained the passages that Stopes asserted were defamatory, which led to the Stopes v. Sutherland case.

Under the headings "Specially Hurtful to the Poor" and "Exposing the Poor to Experiment", Sutherland wrote:

Charles Bradlaugh (and Annie Besant) had been tried in 1877 for publishing 'obscene literature'. They had published an American Malthusian tract in Britain. The original document was The Fruits of Philosophy which "advocated and gave explicit information about contraceptive methods". For the British version, Bradlaugh and Besant had added a subtitle: An Essay on the Population Question and a preface "we believe, with the Rev. Mr. Malthus, that population has a tendency to increase faster than the means of existence, and that some checks must therefore exercise control over population".

Stopes sued Sutherland for libel and the case commenced in the High Court on 21 February 1923. The defendants (Sutherland and his publisher) won. Stopes appealed, won, and was awarded damages of one hundred pounds. Sutherland appealed to the House of Lords and the case was heard for the third time on 21 November 1924. Sutherland won. Stopes was ordered to repay the one hundred pounds arising from the previous hearing, and to pay the defendant's costs in relation to the appeals to the Court of Appeal and the House of Lords.

A second case arose when, in January 1929, Stopes publication Birth Control News attacked Sutherland and this time it was he who took legal action against her for libel. He lost in the Court of Appeal.

Visit to the Mother-and-Baby home at Tuam and to the Magdalene Laundry at Galway 

In 1955, Sutherland again encountered controversy, when he travelled to Ireland to find material for a book. The result, Irish Journey, includes an account of Dr Sutherland's visit to the Mother-and-Baby-Home at Tuam and the Magdalene Laundry in Galway in April 1955. To visit these institutions, Sutherland needed the permission of Michael Browne, the Bishop of Galway. He asked Bishop Browne: "Is there anything to hide?", later adding: "I want to find out how you treat unmarried mothers."

Permission was granted, on condition that Sutherland allowed his account to be censored by the Mother Superior of the Sisters of Mercy, who ran the institution. Accordingly, the account of his visit to the Laundry in "Irish Journey" was censored. In 2013, the publishers draft of "Irish Journey" was discovered in a cellar and the uncensored version was published in "The Suitcase in the Cellar" on hallidaysutherland.com.

Irish Journey caused ripples, which Sutherland described this way, in the preface to the 1958 American edition:

References

External links 
 Halliday Sutherland website
 Exterminating Poverty: The true story of the eugenic plan to get rid of the poor, and the Scottish doctor who fought against it. by Mark H. Sutherland and Neil Sutherland (a book about the Stopes v Sutherland libel trial of 1923). 
 View "The Story of John M'Neil" on the British Film Institute's website
 
 

1882 births
1960 deaths
Writers from Glasgow
Medical doctors from Glasgow
20th-century Scottish medical doctors
People educated at the High School of Glasgow
People educated at Merchiston Castle School
Alumni of the University of Edinburgh
Labour Party (UK) politicians